The Hailey Micropolitan Statistical Area, as defined by the United States Census Bureau, is an area consisting of three counties in the state of Idaho. These counties are Blaine County, Camas County, and Lincoln County. The micropolitan area is anchored by the city of Hailey.

References 

Micropolitan areas of Idaho